Inter-Scholastic Athletic Association or ISAA is an athletic sport organization in the Philippines formed in 2009 by Lyceum of the Philippines University. The Lyceum of the Philippines University started the process of formation of the league when the institution announced its intention to form a collegiate athletic association in 2004.

List of members
 Manila Tytana Colleges – MTC Titans
 FEATI University – FEATI Seahawks
 Manila Adventist College - MAC Soaring Angels
 La Consolacion College Manila – LCCM Blue Royals
 Philippine Women's University – PWU Patriots
 PATTS College of Aeronautics – PATTS Sea Horses
 Immaculada Concepcion College - ICC Blue Hawks
 ICCT Colleges Foundation, Inc. - ICCT Blue Dragons
Treston International College - Treston Golden Lions
 Trinity University of Asia - TUA Stallions
 Air Link International Aviation College - The Blazing Phoenix

Inactive Members
 Taguig City University - TCU Catfish
 St. Dominic College Of Asia – Dominican Red Pikes
 FEU - East Asia College -iTamaraws

Sports
 Basketball
 Volleyball
 Table Tennis
 Swimming
 Badminton
 Bowling
 Futsal
 Chess

See also
 University Athletic Association of the Philippines
 National Collegiate Athletic Association (Philippines)
 Philippine Collegiate Champions League

References

2009 establishments in the Philippines
Student sport in the Philippines